

Aviamilano Costruzione Aeronautiche was an Italian aircraft manufacturer established in Milan in the early 1950s. It was the original manufacturer of Stelio Frati's Falco light aircraft, although when production did not run as smoothly as Frati liked, he took the design to Aeromere instead. Aviamilano's staple product was the Scricciolo trainer built for the Aero Club d'Italia from 1959 onwards. The firm's final product was another Frati design, the F.250, rights to which were sold to SIAI-Marchetti in 1964. The firm closed in 1968 after the death of its Managing Director and the rights to the few sailplanes then in production were bought by Caproni Vizzola.

Aircraft

See also

 List of companies of Italy

References

Bibliography
 

Defunct aircraft manufacturers of Italy